Mount Cantello is a mountain,  high, on the north side of Crawford Glacier,  northwest of Mount Keith, in the Bowers Mountains, a major mountain range situated within Victoria Land, Antarctica. The topographical feature was first mapped by the United States Geological Survey from surveys and from U.S. Navy air photos, 1960–65, and named by the Advisory Committee on Antarctic Names for Dominic Cantello, Jr., U.S. Navy, electrician with the South Pole Station party, 1965. The mountain lies situated on the Pennell Coast, a portion of Antarctica lying between Cape Williams and Cape Adare.

References 

Mountains of Victoria Land
Pennell Coast